Ramshackled is the only solo album by Alan White, drummer for British progressive rock band Yes. It was released in 1976 on Atlantic Records, during a period when all five Yes band members (Jon Anderson, Chris Squire, Steve Howe, Patrick Moraz and White) released solo albums. White only performed drums on the album and neither wrote nor sang any of the songs.

Background and recording
White had worked with Pete Kirtley and Kenny Craddock in the Alan Price Set and Happy Magazine. White, Kirtley, Craddock and Colin Gibson then worked together in the short-lived Griffin in 1969. In the early 1970s, White, Kirtley, Craddock, Gibson and Bud Beadle played together in unsigned band Simpson's Pure Oxygen. Craddock was also in the second line up of Lindisfarne who released two albums between 1973 and 1975. For his debut solo album, White brought Kirtley, Craddock, Gibson and Beadle back together.

Fellow Yes members, Jon Anderson and Steve Howe, guested on "Spring: Song of Innocence". Gibson and wind player Bud Beadle also appeared on Steve Howe's own solo album from the same period, Beginnings. Although he does not appear on the album, Patrick Moraz has a cameo in the promotional video.

Yes subsequently toured in 1976, with initial dates of the tour including material from the members' solo albums, including "One Way Rag" and "Song of Innocence", but these were soon dropped.

Reception

AllMusic's Alex Anderson found the album highly uneven and noted that the album's hodgepodge of popular styles failed to appeal to the progressive rock fanbase White had gained with Yes.  He concluded "Although Ramshackled isn't terrible, most of the Yes fans who bought it agreed that their money hadn't been well spent."

Track listing
"Ooh Baby (Goin' to Pieces)" (Pete Kirtley) 5:33
"One Way Rag" (Colin Gibson, Kenny Craddock) 4:07
"Avakak" (Craddock, Gibson, Kirtley) 6:54
"Spring-Song of Innocence" (lyrics: William Blake, music: Kirtley) 5:02
"Giddy" (Craddock, Gibson) 3:13
"Silly Woman" (Kirtley) 3:15
"Marching Into a Bottle" (Craddock) 2:00
"Everybody" (Craddock, Gibson, Kirtley) 3:14
"Darkness, Pts. 1–3" (Craddock, Gibson) 5:32

Personnel
Alan White – drums, percussion
Bud Beadle, Steve Gregory –  flute, saxophone
Henry Lowther – trumpet
Madeline Bell, Vicki Brown, Joanne Williams – backing vocals
Pete Kirtley – electric and acoustic guitars, vocals
Kenny Craddock – piano, organ, synthesizers, vocals
Alan Marshall – vocals 
Colin Gibson – bass, percussion
David Bedford – orchestral arrangements and conducting
Jon Anderson – vocals on "Spring-Song of Innocence"
Steve Howe – guitar on "Spring-Song of Innocence"

Production
Produced by Alan White & Bob Potter
Recorded & engineered by Alan White, Bob Potter & Paul Hardiman
Assistant & second engineer: Paul Hardiman
Tape cutting engineer: David Tucker

Charts

References

External links
[ "Ramshackled" at AllMusic]

1976 debut albums
Atlantic Records albums
Yes (band)
Albums recorded at IBC Studios